The Monarchy of Britain may refer to:

 The Monarchy of the United Kingdom
 Unbennaeth Prydain ('The Monarchy of Britain'), the medieval Welsh poem and anthem sung before battle